Boca West is a development  in West Boca Raton, Florida. It is an unincorporated community in Palm Beach County, Florida, United States. Boca West was a census-designated place in the 1990 census; its population was then 2,847.

Boca West Golf Club 

There are 72 holes at this golf facility. The golf course is divided into 4 courses, each with 18 holes. The clubhouse is located at Boca West Drive, the main, 4-lane thoroughfare through Boca West. The courses have recently undergone a massive, multimillion-dollar renovation and pro golfers have been seen around the courses playing and practicing.

Geography 

It borders Boca Raton on the north and east, as well as Yamato and Jog Roads. On the south is State Road 808, and on the west is the Florida's Turnpike and Hamptons at Boca Raton.

References

External links
Boca West Country Club Official Website

Unincorporated communities in Palm Beach County, Florida
Former census-designated places in Palm Beach County, Florida
Unincorporated communities in Florida
Former census-designated places in Florida